Micronaclia rubrivittata is a moth of the subfamily Arctiinae. It was described by Max Gaede in 1926. It is found in Cameroon.

References

 

Arctiinae